Yuri Aleksandrovich Meshkov (Yuriy Oleksandrovych Meshkov, ; October 25, 1945 – September 29, 2019) was a Ukrainian politician and a leader of the pro-Russian movement in Crimea. Meshkov served as the only President of Crimea from 1994 to 1995.

Eleven days after his first return to Crimea since 1995, Meshkov was deported from Ukraine on July 13, 2011, with the restriction of entry for 5 years.

Biography

Yuri Meshkov was born on October 25, 1945, in Synelnykove in the Dnipropetrovsk Oblast of the Ukrainian Soviet Socialist Republic (now Ukraine) to a Ukrainian-born mother and a native Kuban Cossack Russian father. He grew up in Simferopol where he finished high school. When he was about eight years old the region of Crimea was officially transferred from the Russian SFSR to the Ukrainian SSR. For his military obligation he served in the Border Guard. In 1967 (in some sources 1977) he graduated from the Law School of Moscow State University. Until 1982 he worked as a detective and then as the head detective in the office of the District's Attorney. From 1982 to 1985 he spent time on the science-researching yacht Skif. After 1985 and until 1990 worked privately as a judicial consultant. At that time he also was one of the leaders of the Crimea department of the All-Union historical-enlighting society "Memorial", and the president of the Crimean Federation of kickboxing.

In 1990, Meshkov was elected as a deputy to the Supreme Council of Crimea (the Republic of Crimea's parliament). There he became the co-founder of the RDK Party (Republican movement of Crimea). In 1994 he stood at the helm of the electoral bloc "Russia" for the republican presidential elections where he easily defeated in the second round of elections Mykola Bahrov who ran as the independent. Mykola Bahrov at that time was the head of the Supreme Council of Crimea. During the second round of the 1994 Crimean presidential elections, Meshkov won with 72.9 percent and elected as the republic's only president.

His main political platform was to facilitate much closer relationships with the Russian Federation up to the possible reunification of Crimea with Russia. Meshkov attempted to initiate a number of measures to prepare Crimea for future integration with Russia; though he was able to align Crimea's time zone with that of Russia he was unable to fully implement his platform nor obtain the support of Russian president Boris Yeltsin for Crimean accession to the Russian Federation.

In response to his efforts, in 1995 the Ukrainian parliament scrapped the Crimean Constitution, abolished the post of president on March 17 and moved to depose and exile Meshkov from the country. Ukrainian special forces entered Meshkov's residence, disarmed his bodyguards and put him on a plane to Moscow.

Living in exile in Moscow, he taught at the Moscow University. He did not return to Crimea till 2 July 2011 because his ex-wife (Lyudmyla) had died (on 28 May 2011). At a 7 July 2011 press conference, he called for a referendum on restoring the Constitution of Crimea 1992 version, which actually declared Crimea a sovereign state. Meshkov also stated then that he ruled out the possibility of his participation in the political life of Crimea because of the need to change citizenship; but instead would participate in "the work of social organizations". He also stated "the Russian movement in Crimea is divided and overrun by random people and traitors". The District Administrative Court of Crimea controlled by Ukraine at that time deported Meshkov from Ukraine with the restriction of entry for 5 years on 13 July 2011.

After the 2014 annexation of Crimea by Russia, Meshkov returned to the peninsula.

References

Prime Ministers of Crimea
1945 births
2019 deaths
Kuban Cossacks
People deported from Ukraine
Russian people of Ukrainian descent
Ukrainian people of Russian descent
People from Synelnykove
Separatists
Russian nationalists